A mechitza (halachik wall) together with an eruv chatzerot, commonly known in English as a community eruv, is a symbolic boundary that allows Jews who observe the religious rules concerning Shabbat to carry certain items outside of their homes that would otherwise be forbidden during Shabbat. An eruv accomplishes this by integrating a number of private and public properties into one larger private domain, thereby avoiding restrictions on carrying objects from the private to the public domain on the Sabbath and holidays.

This is a list of places that have eruvin, both historic and modern, that are or were rabbinically recognized.

Australia

Melbourne
Sydney:
Eastern Suburbs
Perth

Austria

Vienna

Belarus 

 Drahichyn (not functional)

Belgium

Antwerp

Brazil
São Paulo (some quarters)
Rio de Janeiro (some quarters)

Canada

British Columbia

Vancouver

Nova Scotia

Halifax

Ontario

London
Ottawa
Toronto
Hamilton

Quebec

Montreal
De Vimy
Dollard-des-Ormeaux 
Hampstead / Côte Saint-Luc / Snowdon
Outremont
Westmount

France
Strasbourg
Metz
Reims

Gibraltar

Gibraltar

Israel
While this list includes some eruvin in Israel for which references have been found on the Internet, virtually every community in Israel where observant Jews live has an eruv. Those which lack eruvin include non-Jewish communities like Arab, Bedouin or Druze towns, and some non-religious kibbutzim. 
Jerusalem
Ramat Bet Shemesh
Tel Aviv-Jaffa

Italy

Venice

Lithuania 

 Vilnius (not functional)

Mexico
Mexico City

Netherlands

Amsterdam

Poland
Kraków (not functional)

Portugal 

 Belmonte

Puerto Rico 

 Isla Verde

Russia 

 Moscow

Slovakia 

 Bratislava (not functional)

South Africa
 Cape Town
Sea Point 
Johannesburg
Edenvale
Gallo Manor
Glenhazel
Illovo
Linksfield
Morningside
Morningside Manor
Oaklands
Oxford
Strathavon
Victory Park
Waverley
Pretoria

Ukraine 

 Odessa (not functional)

United Kingdom

Edgware
North West London (Hendon, Golders Green, Hampstead Garden Suburb)
New Barnet
Elstree/Borehamwood
Brondesbury Park
Bushey
Stanmore
Belmont
Mill Hill
Manchester
Chigwell
South Hampstead
St John's Wood
Woodside Park
 Stamford Hill (as of June 2020)
Westcliff-on-Sea
Canvey Island
 Pinner

United States

Alabama

Mountain Brook / Cahaba Heights (suburbs of Birmingham).

Arizona

Chandler, Guadalupe, Tempe
Phoenix, Scottsdale
Tucson

California

Albany/Berkeley
Irvine
Long Beach
Los Angeles:
Agoura Hills, Beverly Hills, Hancock Park, Pico-Robertson, West Hollywood, & Westwood
Chatsworth, Granada Hills, North Hills, & Northridge
North Hollywood, Valley Village, Van Nuys, Sherman Oaks, Sherman Village, and Panorama City
Woodland Hills/West Hills
Oakland
Palo Alto
San Diego:
College Area
La Jolla
University City
San Francisco
San Jose

Colorado

Denver:
East side
West side
Southeast

Connecticut

Bridgeport/Fairfield
New Haven:
Yale University 
Norwich
Stamford
Waterbury
West Hartford

Florida

Aventura
Bal Harbour
Boca Raton
Boca Raton North
Boynton Beach
Coconut Grove
Cooper City
Coral Springs
Deerfield Beach
Delray Beach
Ft. Lauderdale
Hallandale
Highland Lakes
Hollywood/Fort Lauderdale
Jacksonville
Miami
North Miami Beach
 Ormond Beach
Parkland
Pembroke Pines - Century Village
Plantation
Sunny Isles Beach
Orlando, FL (dr Philips)

Georgia

Atlanta:
Virginia Highland eruv (also includes parts of the Morningside-Lenox Park neighborhood)
North Druid Hills
Dunwoody
Sandy Springs (Inside the Perimeter)
Sandy Springs (Downtown)
Alpharetta
Savannah

Illinois

Buffalo Grove
Champaign-Urbana
Chicago: 
West Rogers Park (also includes a very small part of the Evanston suburb) 
Lincolnwood/Peterson Park 
Lakeview 
Evanston (Under Construction)
Glenview/Northbrook
Highland Park
Skokie

Indiana

Indianapolis
South Bend

Kansas

Overland Park

Kentucky

Louisville

Louisiana

Metairie
New Orleans

Maryland

Annapolis
Baltimore
Bethesda (Conservative)
Brookeville/Olney
Chevy Chase
Glyndon, Owings Mills, & Reisterstown
Potomac
Rockville/North Bethesda
Silver Spring:
Colesville, Hillandale, White Oak, Woodmoor, Northwood, Kemp Mill, & Wheaton
Woodside Park
University of Maryland, College Park
Johns Hopkins University, Homewood Campus.

Massachusetts

Brighton, Brookline, Newton, South Newton, and West Newton
Brandeis University (Waltham).
Cambridge/Somerville
Longmeadow/Springfield
Malden
Sharon
Worcester

Michigan
Ann Arbor
Southfield
Oak Park
West Bloomfield Township

Minnesota

Minneapolis/St. Louis Park
 Highland Park, Saint Paul

Missouri

Chesterfield
St. Louis

Nebraska

Omaha

Nevada

Las Vegas

New Jersey

Aberdeen Township
 Bradley Beach
Cherry Hill
East Brunswick
Edison, Highland Park, & New Brunswick
Elizabeth
Englewood
Fair Lawn
 Fort Lee
Linden
Livingston
Jersey City
Manalapan Township
Marlboro Township
Margate (http://vaadatlantic.org/4.html)
Maplewood
Monroe Township
Paramus
Parsippany
Passaic-Clifton
Rutherford
Teaneck, Bergenfield, & New Milford
Tenafly
Ventnor (http://vaadatlantic.org/4.html)
West Orange

New York

Albany
Amherst (suburb of Buffalo)
Binghamton
Ithaca (Cornell University)
Nassau County (Long Island):
Cedarhurst/Woodmere
Great Neck
Lawrence
Long Beach
Merrick
North Bellmore
Oceanside
Plainview
Roslyn
Valley Stream
West Hempstead-Franklin Square
Fleetwood
New Rochelle
New York City
The Bronx
Albert Einstein College of Medicine
Kingsbridge
Riverdale
Brooklyn
Brooklyn Eruv, Brooklyn
Borough Park
Brooklyn Heights
Crown Heights
Flatbush has three overlapping eruvin – Haredi, Sefardi, and Modern Orthodox
Manhattan Beach
Park Slope
Starrett City
Williamsburg
Manhattan:
Midtown Manhattan's eruv spans a large part of the island, but circumvents western Midtown and Hell's Kitchen. It extends to the Upper West Side and Morningside Heights to the northwest; the Upper East Side to the northeast; Greenwich Village to the southwest; and East Village to the southeast. There are also extensions of the eruv to Harlem and Hudson Square/Chelsea.
Washington Heights
Yeshiva University
Queens:
Bayside/Bay Terrace
Bayswater 
Briarwood
Far Rockaway
Forest Hills
Hillcrest
Jamaica Estates/Holliswood
Kew Gardens
Kew Gardens Hills
New York Hospital Medical Center of Queens
Sunnyside
Windsor Park/Bayside
Staten Island:
Eltingville
Willowbrook
Poughkeepsie
Ramapo
Rochester
Scarsdale
Suffolk County (Long Island):
East Northport
Stony Brook
Westhampton Beach
Syracuse
Vestal (Binghamton University)
White Plains
Wingdale (Camp Ramah in the Berkshires)
Yonkers

North Carolina 

 Durham

Ohio

Beachwood, Cleveland Heights, Shaker Heights, South Euclid, and University Heights
Cincinnati
Bexley and parts of Columbus

Oregon

Portland
Eugene

Pennsylvania
Allentown
Bensalem 
Elkins Park
Harrisburg
Lancaster
Lower Merion Township has two eruvin, the Lower Merion eruv, in Bala Cynwyd and Merion Station and another eruv in Wynnewood. The two eruvin connect in a few places.
Narberth (The Lower Merion eruv extends into Narberth, Narberth doesn't have its own eruv.)
Philadelphia:
Center City
Northeast Philadelphia
 Overbrook
University City
Pittsburgh
Scranton
Wilkes-Barre

Rhode Island

Providence

South Carolina

Charleston
South Windermere
West Ashley
Columbia

Tennessee

Memphis
Nashville:
Bellevue
Cherokee Park, Richland–West End Historic District, and Green Hills

Texas

Austin
Dallas:
Far North Dallas
North Dallas
Plano
Richardson
Houston:
Fondren Southwest
Meyerland
Willow Meadows

Utah
 Park City

Virginia

Encompasses parts of the City of Fairfax and Fairfax County
Richmond
Norfolk

Washington

Seattle:
Seward Park
Wedgwood–View Ridge–Ravenna–Laurelhurst
Mercer Island

Washington, D.C.

Barnaby Woods, Brightwood Park, Chevy Chase, Hawthorne, and Rock Creek Gardens
Adams Morgan, Burleith, Capitol Hill, Cleveland Park, Crestwood, Downtown, Dupont Circle, Foggy Bottom, Georgetown, Le Droit Park, Mount Pleasant, Navy Yard/Near Southeast, Petworth, Trinidad, and Woodley Park

Wisconsin

Glendale
Mequon
Milwaukee

Uruguay 

 Montevideo
 Punta Del Este

References

External links
 Eruv.org - Global Eruv Directory with websites and contact information
 Communities with Eruvin

Shabbat
Orthodox Judaism
Judaism-related lists